South Bishnupur is a village and a gram panchayat within the jurisdiction of the Mandirbazar police station in  the Mandirbazar CD block in the Diamond Harbour subdivision of the South 24 Parganas district in the Indian state of West Bengal.

Geography

Transport
South Bishnupur is on the State Highway 1.

Mathurapur Road railway station is located nearby.

Healthcare
Naiyarat Rural Hospital at Krishnapur, with 30 beds, is the major government medical facility in the Mandirbazar CD block.

References

Villages in South 24 Parganas district